The Play-offs of the 1993 Federation Cup Americas Zone were the final stages of the Zonal Competition involving teams from the Americas. Those that qualified for this stage placed first and second in their respective pools.

The eight teams were then randomly paired up to compete in four play-off ties, with the winners qualifying for the World Group.

Colombia vs. Paraguay

Peru vs. Venezuela

Chile vs. Trinidad and Tobago

Uruguay vs. Mexico

See also
Fed Cup structure

References

External links
 Fed Cup website

1993 Federation Cup Americas Zone